Krong Kam is a 2019 Thai TV drama that originally aired on Channel 3 starting from February 26 to April 30, 2019 for 19 episodes.

Synopsis
The whole story took place at Chum Saeng, Nakhon Sawan, in 1967. Yoi (Mai Charoenpura) is a middle-aged Thai woman who married into a Thai-Chinese family. She vowed to personally see to it that her family of six honors the Beh ancestors. She amassed a fortune in family businesses that consist of a grocery and the grain store, a rice mill that her husband runs, and various farmlands and properties across Nakhon Sawan province. She is foul-mouthed, irritable and a skinflint. She and her husband have four sons. All members of the family, including employees and Chum Saeng people, were fearing her.

One day, her eldest son, Chai (Thakrit Tawanpong), comes from the army, bringing a pregnant prostitute Renu (Ranee Campen) as his wife even though he already has a fiancée, Philai (Pitchapa Phanthumchinda). Yoi rejects this and tries every possible way to make him leave Renu but fails. Unknown to her, Renu has performed black magic to tie her son's heart. She decided to marry her second son Tong (Chanathip Phothongkam) to Philai to avoid shame even though he likes a worker named Chanta (Preeyakarn Jaikanta) and also chooses to give Tong the house and store that she was supposed to give to her eldest. Her third son Sa (Jirayu Tangsrisuk) is the kindest. He is handsome, smart and charming. When Yoi finds out he has feelings for Chanta, she worries he will imitate his eldest brother. She decides to marry him off into a rich family. Unknown to her is that the family is tricking him into marrying their already pregnant daughter to avoid shame.

Cast

Yoi's family
 Mai Charoenpura as Yoi
 Nattacha Phosung as Yoi in her youth
 Prinn Wikran as Lakseng, Yoi's husband
 Patiphan Mimang as Lakseng in his youth
 Children
 Thakrit Tawanpong as Pathom "Chai" Atsawarungrueangkit, first son
 Chanathip Phothongkam as Prasong "Tong" Atsawarungrueangkit, second son
 Jirayu Tangsrisuk as Kamon "Sa" Atsawarungrueangkit, third son
 Vachiravit Paisarnkulwong as Mongkhon "Si" Atsawarungrueangkit, fourth son
 Employees
 Thunyaphat Pattarateerachaicharoen as Bunpluk, Yoi's employee and Tong's second wife
 Atthaphon Thetthawong as Pom, Yoi's employee and Bunpluk's older brother
 Relatives
 Chomchai Chatwilai as Lim, Lakseng's mother, murdered by Yoi
 Ratklao Amaradit as Yaem, Yoi's younger sister, protagonist in the previous prequel (Sud Kaen Saen Rak) (cameo)
 Pornnapat Wongwiwat as Yaem in her youth

Renu's family
 Ranee Campen as Renu, raped by elder brother-in-law Dam, later first wife of Chai
 Sirintra Niyakorn as Rerai, mother of Renu, Saithong, and Wanna
 Sisters
 Aerin Yuktadatta as Saithong, Renu's eldest sister
 Rinrada Kaewbuasai as Wanna, Renu's younger sister and Si's love interest
 Visarut Hiranbuth as Dam, Saithong's husband
 Children
 Pongtiwat Tangwancharoen as Pok, son of Renu and Dam
 Pakapol Tanpanich as Pok in his youth
 Pakpuseth Chakornviroj as Pranot, son of Renu and Chai
 Fellow prostitutes
 Arisara Wongchalee as Tim
 Oijai Dan-esan as Pranom, in charge of prostitution house Lotus Bar
 Thanchanok Hongthongkam as Wan
 Suchao Pongwilai as Kon, old shaman who assists Renu

Philai's family
 Pitchapa Phanthumchinda as Philai, Tong's first wife, originally girlfriend of Chai, Tong's elder brother
 Paweena Chariffsakul as Phikun, Philai's mother
 Chalad Na Songkhla as Choet, former employee at Philai's family
 Danai Jarujinda as Somdi, young shaman, Philai's second husband

Chanta's family
 Preeyakarn Jaikanta as Chanta, love interest of Tong, Sa, and Chinnakon; secret wife of Subin, Chinnakon's elder brother-in-law; eventually second wife of Sa
 Waraphan Nguitrakul as Mui Ni, Chanta's employer
 Orasa Isarankura na Ayudhya as Puai Huai, Mui Ni's grandmother

Phiangphen's family
 Oranate D.Caballes as Phiangphen, becoming Sa's first wife while pregnant with Kan
 Denkhun Ngamnet as Kan, Phiangphen's lover and husband
 Kasama Nitsaiphan as Village Chief Son, Phiangphen's father
 Prissana Klampinij as Somphon, Son's wife and Phiangphen's mother
 Janya Thanasawangkul as Si, Son's younger sister
 Natanee Sitthisaman as Raem, Son's servant

Other characters
 Sirinrat Vidhyaphum as Onphanni, Chai's second wife
 Karunchida Khumsuwan as Mala, Si's wife
 Natnari Chuwongwan as Kamala, daughter of Mala and Si
 Jitpanu Klomkaew as District Assistant Chief Chinnakon, Chanta's husband-to-be, eventually Wanna's husband
 Kosawis Piyasakulkaew as Subin, Chinnakon's brother-in-law and Chanta's secret husband
 Chotiros Kaewpinit as Krongkaeo, Chinnakon's older sister, Subin's wife
 Pawanrat Naksuriya as Mao, kluai khaek hawker
 Khakkingrak Khikkhiksaranang as A, gold shop's owner
 Nisachon Tuamsoongnuen as Bang-on, young woman who courts Kan
 Napat Chumjittri as Wang, Kan's friend, Bang-on's husband
 Khunkanich Koomkrong as Kun, Kan's ailing mother
 Phichet Iamchaona as Sit, a luk thung band manager

Original soundtrack

Part 1

Part 2

Part 3

Ratings
In this table,  represent the lowest ratings and  represent the highest ratings.

Reception
Krong Kam is a prequel to another drama that had been popular on Channel 3 in 2015, Sud Kaen Saen Rak.

When the drama aired, it quickly gained popularity. Fans and the general public traveled to Chum Saeng by train, making this small town more famous and well-known. The author, Chulamanee, admitted that he wrote this novel using Chum Saeng as a backdrop, in hope that people would visit the place.

The drama featured a powerful performance by Mai Charoenpura, a pop star who had not acted for many years.

Until the early 2021, it has been rerunned three times, but the ratings are still as good as the first broadcast.

Awards and nominations

References

External links
 

2019 Thai television series debuts
2019 Thai television series endings
Channel 3 (Thailand) original programming
Television series set in the 1960s
Thai drama television series
Thai television soap operas